The Ultimate Death Worship is the fifth studio album by the Norwegian symphonic black metal band Limbonic Art released in 2002 on Nocturnal Art Productions. The album was recorded winter 2001/2002 and mastered at Strype Audio. There was also an LP release by Displeased Records with a bonus track "Voyage of the Damned". In 2010 it was re-released by Candlelight Records with the above-mentioned bonus track.

Track listing

The LP version by Displeased Records puts the bonus track between "Purgatorial Agony" and "Towards the Oblivion of Dreams".

Personnel
Daemon - guitars, vocals, piano on "Towards the Oblivion of Dreams", lyrics
Morfeus - guitars, electronics, cover art

Additional personnel
Attila Csihar - vocals on "From the Shades of Hatred"
Peter Lundell - engineering
Tom Kvålsvoll - mastering

External links
The Ultimate Death Worship at Allmusic

2002 albums
Limbonic Art albums